The Network for Greening the Financial System (NGFS) is a network of 114 central banks and financial supervisors that aims to accelerate the scaling up of green finance and develop recommendations for central banks' role for climate change. The NGFS was created in 2017 and its secretariat is hosted by the Banque de France. Its current chair is Ravi Menon, Managing Director of the Monetary Authority of Singapore. The NGFS has been awarded best green initiative of the year 2020 by Centralbanking.com.

According to its charter, the purpose of the NGFS is "to define, promote and contribute to the development of best practices to be implemented within and outside of the Membership of the NGFS and to conduct or commission analytical work on green finance."

The NGFS was announced at the Paris “One Planet Summit” in December 2017. The network was launched by 8 founding central banks, under the leadership of Banque de France's governor François Villeroy de Galhau, the Dutch Central Bank's Frank Elderson and the Bank of England's former governor Mark Carney.

Work and activities 
The NGFS organises events and research on climate change.

Recommendations for central banks and supervisory authorities 

In 2021, the NGFS identified 9 policy options that could be chosen by central banks to align their monetary policy with climate objectives.

The NGFS work is currently organised around 5 workstreams:

 “Microprudential/Supervision”, chaired by Mr Zeng Yi Wong from the Monetary Authority of Singapore
 “Macrofinancial”, chaired by Ms Sarah Breeden from the Bank of England
 “Scaling up green finance”, chaired by Ms Sabine Mauderer from the Deutsche Bundesbank
 “Bridging the data gaps”, chaired by Mr Patrick Amis from the European Central Bank and Mr Fabio Natalucci from the International Monetary Fund
 “Research”, chaired by Mr Ma Jun from the People's Bank of China

Climate scenarios 

In June 2020, the NGFS presented its climate scenarios as a common baseline for analysing climate risks to the economy and the financial system. Expanded and updated data were published in the two subsequent years. The scenarios are based on the three integrated assessment models REMIND-MAgPIE (Potsdam Institute for Climate Impact Research), GCAM (University of Maryland) and MESSAGEix-GLOBIOM (International Institute for Applied Systems Analysis). Their results were fed into the NiGEM model (National Institute of Economic and Social Research) to conduct further macroeconomic analyses on inflation or unemployment. In addition, climate data provided by Climate Analytics and the ETH Zurich are published.

The following six scenarios were examined: "Current Policies" considers only already implemented climate policies, while "NDCs" assumes that the voluntary pledges of Nationally Determined Contributions are met. "Below 2°C" assumes that a two-degree target in line with the Paris Agreement will be met, while "Net Zero 2050" assumes a 1.5-degree target will be achieved through early, globally coordinated climate policies. "Delayed Transition" assumes tighter climate policies only from 2030, while "Divergent Net Zero" envisages regionally and sectorally different climate adaptation.

Governance and membership 
Today the NGFS comprises 75 members and 13 observers.

References 

Finance industry associations
Organizations established in 2017
Organizations based in Paris